D'Influence (also D-Influence and D*Influence) is a British production team and acid jazz band. Formerly of The Echo Label, they founded their own label, Freakstreet Records. Original members include Kwame Kwaten, Sarah-Ann Webb, Ed Baden-Powell, and Steve Marston.

Biography
D'Influence emerged in 1990 from the UK club scene. The group went on to issue their debut album titled Good 4 We in August 1992. The album reached No. 7 on the Blues & Soul Top British Soul Albums chart. The song "Good Lover" from the LP got to No. 11 on the Blues & Soul Top British Soul Singles chart.

D'Influence later issued in 1995 their sophomore studio album, Prayer 4 Unity. The album reached No. 17 on the UK R&B Albums chart. A song off the album, "Midnite" reached No. 17 on the UK R&B Singles chart.

The group went on to issue other hit singles such as "Hypnotize" (1997, UK No. 33) and "Rock with You" (1998, UK No. 30).

In 2017, the band regrouped for one-off concerts at various top London clubs and summer festivals in the UK. Reviewing their 'generation-spanning' set at Love Supreme festival, Mike Hobart of the Financial Times praised "the slinky, bass-heavy grooves that sustained their success in the 1990s." He also proclaimed that D'Influence "last played a festival 17 years ago, their current revival coming about after a promoter saw... their annual get-together jam on Instagram. The band has lost none of its sass." 2018 saw further performances in the UK, Africa and Europe.

Other work
As a group, D'Influence have produced and remixed hit singles for British pop and R&B artists such as Mark Morrison ("Return of the Mack"), Shola Ama ("You Might Need Somebody", "Much Love"), Lighthouse Family ("Raincloud") and for Ultra Naté ("New Kind of Medicine"). They have also remixed songs for Mick Jagger, Tom Jones, American rapper Jay-Z ("Wishing on a Star", Bring It On: The Best of Jay-Z), and performed live with Icelandic singer-songwriter Björk (Later with Jools Holland).

Albums
Good 4 We (1992)
Prayer 4 Unity (1995)
London (1997) – UK No. 56
D'Influence Presents D-Vas (2002)

References

External links
[ "D'Influence"], AllMusic.com.
"D-Influence", SoulWalking.

Acid jazz ensembles
British record production teams
Remixers